This is the discography of Japanese electronic music band Yellow Magic Orchestra (YMO).

Studio albums

Live albums
1980 Public Pressure – Japan No. 1
1984 After Service – Japan No. 2
1991 Faker Holic (Transatlantic Tour 1979) – Japan No. 50
1992 Complete Service (mixed by Brian Eno) – Japan No. 37
1993 Technodon Live – Japan No. 12
1993 Live At The Budokan 1980 – Japan No. 87
1993 Live At Kinokuniya Hall 1978 – Japan No. 55
1995 Winter Live 1981
1996 World Tour 1980 – Japan No. 59
1997 Live At The Greek Theatre 1979
2000 One More YMO
2008 Euymo – Yellow Magic Orchestra Live in London + Gijon 2008
2008 LONDONYMO - Yellow Magic Orchestra Live in London 15/6 08
2008 Gijonymo – Yellow Magic Orchestra Live in Gijon 19/6 08
2015 No Nukes 2012

Compilation albums
1980 X∞Multiplies
1982 YMO Best Selection
1984 Sealed
1987 Y.M.O. History
1992 Technobible
1992 Kyoretsu Na Rhythm
2000 YMO Go Home! : The Best of Yellow Magic Orchestra, (compiled by Haruomi Hosono)
2001 One More YMO: The Best of YMO Live (compiled by Yukihiro Takahashi)
2003 UC YMO: Ultimate Collection of Yellow Magic Orchestra (compiled by Ryuichi Sakamoto)
2011 YMO (compiled by YMO)
2018 NEU TANZ (Towa Tei supervised and selected the songs, and Yoshinori Sunahara was in charge of remastering)

Remix albums
1983 Naughty Boys Instrumental – Japan No. 18
1993 Hi-tech/No Crime (Yellow Magic Orchestra Reconstructed) (UK compilation of remixes by British artists)
2000 YMO Remixes Technopolis 2000-00 (Japanese compilation of remixes by Japanese artists)

Singles
"Firecracker" (1978, Japan; 1979, US, UK)
"Yellow Magic (Tong Poo)" (1978, Japan; 1979, UK)
"Computer Game" (1979, US, Canada, Europe) – UK No. 17, US No. 60
"Cosmic Surfin" (1979, US)
"La Femme Chinoise" (1979, Europe) (Lyrics: Chris Mosdell)
"Technopolis" (1979, Japan) – Japan No. 9
"Rydeen" (1980, Japan; 1982, UK) – Japan No. 15
"Behind the Mask" (1979, US; 1980, UK, Italy) (Lyrics: Chris Mosdell)
"Nice Age" (1980, UK, Netherlands) (Lyrics: Chris Mosdell)
"Tighten Up (Japanese Gentlemen Stand Up Please)" (cover version of Archie Bell & the Drells hit; 1980, Japan, US, UK) – Japan No. 43
"Cue" (1981, Japan, US)
"Mass" (1981, Japan)
"Taiso" (1982, Australia, Japan)
"Pure Jam" (1982, Spain)
"Kimi ni Mune Kyun" (1983, Japan) – Japan No. 2
"The Spirit of Techno / Kageki na Shukujo" (1983, Japan) – Japan No. 15
"Ishin Denshin (You've Got To Help Yourself)" (1983, Japan) – Japan No. 23
"Every Time I Look Around (I Hear The Madmen Call)" (1983, Holland)
Reconstructions EP (1992, UK)
"Pocketful of Rainbows" (1993, Japan) – Japan No. 13
"Be A Superman" (1993, Japan) – Japan No. 76
"Rescue / Rydeen 79/07" (2007, Japan) – Digital download release: March 10, 2007, CD release: August 22, 2007
"The City of Light / Tokyo Town Pages" (2008, Japan)
"Good Morning, Good Night" (2009, Japan) – by HASYMO

Music videos

References

Discographies of Japanese artists
Electronic music discographies